Fauldhouse is a village in West Lothian, Scotland. It is about halfway between Glasgow and Edinburgh. The nearest towns to Fauldhouse are Whitburn and Livingston. Other neighbouring villages include Longridge, Shotts and Stoneyburn. At approximately 750 feet above sea level, Fauldhouse is one of the highest villages in West Lothian.

History
Settlements and farms within Fauldhouse have existed since, at least, the Middle Ages, and was known until the 19th century by the names Falas, Fallas, Fawlhous and Falhous. The first written mention of Fauldhouse was in 1523. The seventeenth century Dutch mapmaker Willem Blaeu features Fauldhouse as Falas on two maps in his Atlas Novus of Scotland, and there are families with the surname Fallas. The name Fallas or Fauldhouse has been translated as "house on the fold", "house in the field", or "house on unploughed (fallow) land". However, the name may be older than the Middle Ages, and might even be derived from the Brythonic or Welsh-type language once spoken in the Lothian region. Historically, Fauldhouse was in the parish of Livingston but in 1730 it was transferred to Whitburn.

Fauldhouse is a former mining community. A mine existed in the area as early as 1790. However, the community developed extensively from the 1830s following discovery of coal and iron resources, in particular the discovery of an extractable slatery ironstone. Focusing initially around three smaller settlements (Crofthead, Drybridge and Greenburn), the village eventually grew and combined as one settlement, following new mines and the coming of the railway in 1845 (transportation of mine workings) and a second line in 1869. Some twenty mines were in operation around Fauldhouse, with the last closing in 1974. Nearby significant local mines and quarries (now closed) included:

 The Greenburn Pit (iron ore).
 Crofthead Quarry and mines (sandstone and iron ore), below the area now marked by Quarry road. Crofthead also included a brick works. Operations ceased in 1909 and the area was used as a rubbish dump by West Lothian County Council before returned to private ownership.
 Fauldhousehills and Fallahills quarries (sandstone).
 Braehead quarries (sandstone, coal and other minerals).
 Shotts road colliery, established between 1864 and 1899.
 Bridge-end colliery (coal).
 Eastfield collieries (coal and iron ore).

The central street, Main Street has a number of substantial ashlar stone cottages. These are known locally as the “Garibaldi Row”. Those stone houses in the West End were constructed by Thomas Thornton & Co who also owned the miners shop. In 1895, the Caledonia Hotel was built and served as a station hotel and cultural venue for the village. The building has oriel windows. The hotel was damaged by fire in 1985 and then closed in 1992 when it was converted into flats. In 1900, Crofthead Primary school was built in the village. The school was three storeys and has since been converted into a care home, as other new schools have been built.  In 1908, a drill hall was built in the village and alter incorporated into the structure of the local mining institute. The hall had an indoor firing range and in 1914 the hall was base for "F" Company, 10th [Cyclist] Battalion, Royal Scots.

The village previously had a theatre and cinema, the Palace Theatre, which opened in 1914. It later became the Savoy Bingo Club and was then demolished.

Transport

The village is served by the Fauldhouse railway station, on the Shotts Line between Glasgow and Edinburgh, McGill's Scotland East operate service 26 between Bathgate and Livingston North via Whitburn, Fauldhouse, Loganlea & Livingston Centre

Lothian Country used to operate service 281 between Livingston, Bathgate and Fauldhouse but this was withdrawn in November 2021

Education
The village has two primary schools, Falla Hill and St. John the Baptist RC. The local high school for Falla Hill is Whitburn Academy and for St John the Baptist, St. Kentigern's Academy in Blackburn.

Religion

There are two churches in Fauldhouse. St Andrew's Kirk on Main Street was built in 1866 and designed by Angus Kennedy. It is in a Gothic revival style and has buttresses and a traceried window.

The church of St. John the Baptist was the first Roman Catholic parish in West Lothian and was built in 1873. Designed by W & R Ingram, it consists of a chapel with corbelled belfry and spirelet above a rose window and contains several fine examples of Stained Glass.

Geography

Sports

Football 

The local football club is Fauldhouse United, winners of the Scottish Junior Cup in 1946, who now play in the East of Scotland Football League. 

In 2001, the Fauldhouse Foxes BC was formed, later known as Fauldhouse FCA. They now operate with teams ranging from Under 9 up to Under 19. The Under 13s won the Scottish Cup in 2011, beating Syngenta Juveniles 3–0 in the final.

Golf 
To the south of Fauldhouse is the 18-hole Greenburn Golf Course which was founded in 1892, but has been on its present site for around 50 years.  Trains run through the course over a viaduct.

Cricket 
The local cricket club is Fauldhouse Victoria. They were established in 1855, and are one of the oldest clubs in Scotland.   The 1st team plays in the East of Scotland Division 1.

Swimming 
The swimming club in Fauldhouse is called the Fauldhouse Penguins. They are part of the swimming development programme in West Lothian called Swim West Lothian (SWL).

Notable people

Stephen Greenhorn, who wrote River City and Marchlands, is from Fauldhouse. In 2013, Greenhorn adapted his musical Sunshine on Leith for the big screen. The film was shot in Glasgow and Edinburgh in late 2012; it stars Peter Mullan and Jane Horrocks, and is directed by Dexter Fletcher.

John McLaren, won the title Scottish Junior Cross Country Champion in 1954, and then retained the title. In 1955, McLaren won the English title and came in 12th in the 1956 International Cross Country Championships. He represented Scotland six times throughout his career.

Paige Turley, winner of the TV show Love Island.

Jack Aitchison football, former Celtic player. 

Neil Findlay Former Member of the Scottish Parliament.

Craig Robertson International badminton, now badminton coach.

Reese Lynch Boxing, won gold at the 2022 Birmingham Commonwealth Games.

See also
 Fauldhouse and Crofthead railway station

References

External links

Undiscovered Scotland - Fauldhouse

Villages in West Lothian